Warrior Arena is an ice hockey arena and practice facility in Brighton, Boston, Massachusetts. The arena is part of a larger mixed-use development being constructed by New Balance at Boston Landing that includes the headquarters of New Balance and that will also include shops, a hotel and the practice facility for both the Boston Bruins and a separate one for the Boston Celtics next door (The Auerbach Center). The arena is named after New Balance's Warrior Sports brand, which is the brand New Balance uses for their hockey products.

  Warrior Arena is the home arena of the Boston Pride of the Premier Hockey Federation and the practice facility of the Boston Bruins of the National Hockey League who moved in from Harvard University's Bright-Landry Hockey Center, and Ristuccia Ice Arena in Wilmington, Massachusetts respectively.

Public transit to the facility is via the MBTA Boston Landing station, a station on the MBTA Commuter Rail system's Framingham/Worcester Line. Groundbreaking took place in December 2014, with the completed facility hosting its grand opening on September 8, 2016.

References

External links
Warrior Ice Arena page at Boston Landing

2016 establishments in Massachusetts
Boston Bruins
Boston Landing
Boston Pride
Indoor ice hockey venues in Massachusetts
National Hockey League practice facilities
New Balance
Sports venues completed in 2016
Sports venues in Boston